Montefiore Follick (31 December 1887 – 10 December 1958) was a British Labour Party politician, a campaigner for spelling reform, polyglot and advocate of decimal currency. He was Member of Parliament (MP) for Loughborough from 1945 to 1955, having previously held the post of Professor of English at the University of Madrid in Spain. He had been adopted by the Loughborough Labour Party in 1936 as prospective parliamentary candidate but had a long wait because of the war years before being elected. In 1949 and again in 1952 he introduced private member's bills in the UK parliament for the reform of English spelling. He also bought the Loughborough Labour Party's current Building Unity House in 1947.

Follick was born in Cardiff and educated at the Sorbonne, Halle (Dr Phil) and Padua. His family was Jewish, and he was named after Sir Moses Montefiore. He served as secretary to the Aga Khan, Sir Robert Philp (Premier of Queensland) and Mulay Hafid (Sultan of Morocco). He stood unsuccessfully for the Parliamentary constituencies of Ashford (1929), East Surrey (1931) and Fulham West (1935) before his successful bid for Loughborough in 1945.

Follick was also the founder and proprietor of the Regent School of Languages (destroyed by enemy action, but now part of the University of Westminster). On his death, he bequeathed the substantial sums raised by this venture to found and endow a professor's chair of Comparative Philology "in which spelling reform (not merely the teaching of reading) should form a principal part". The bequest was finally accepted by the University of Manchester, and a chair bearing Follick's name is still in existence.

His publications include The Adam’s Lottery, 1919; Influence of English, 1934; Facing Facts, 1935; Efforts of Chance, 1938; English Grammar for Foreigners, 11 editions; and The Twelve Republics, 1952. In his book "Facing Facts", (started in 1932) Follick accurately foretold the aggressions of Germany and the Japanese invasion of China. The book started with the words "Beware Europe" and ended with "You have been warned". The Case for Spelling Reform was published posthumously in 1965 by Sir Isaac Pitman & Sons; on p. v are the phrases "To the schoolchildren of Britain a consistent alphabet; To the nations of the world an international language".

Follick was a member of the Fabian Society, and fellow of the Royal Geographical Society, and of the Royal Society of Arts. He was also the inventor and patentee of the Geodok system of teaching geography.

References

External links 
 
 Mont Follick Papers at the University of Manchester Library.

1887 births
1958 deaths
Welsh Jews
Politicians from Cardiff
English-language spelling reform advocates
Labour Party (UK) MPs for English constituencies
Members of the Parliament of the United Kingdom for Loughborough
UK MPs 1945–1950
UK MPs 1950–1951
UK MPs 1951–1955
Fellows of the Royal Geographical Society
Jewish British politicians